Waltons can refer to:

Waltons (department store), an Australian department store chain
Waltons Stores (Interstate) Ltd v Maher, a contracts case involving the department store
Waltons (Canadian band)
Residents in the Walton Well Road area of Oxford, England

See also 
The Waltons (disambiguation)
Walton (disambiguation)